Muqeem Khan Pride of Pakistan (born 1968) is the first Pakistani who started working in the Hollywood visual effects industry in 1996. He is an animator, artist, interaction designer, percussionist, filmmaker, academician, and a herbal physician - Hakim (title), As a student at National College of Arts (NCA), Muqeem developed passion for computer graphics nearly twenty-five years ago in his early student life by doing some compositions and screen credits in BASIC language on IBM XT, ZX Spectrum and Commodore 64 computers.

Film credits 
Final Fantasy: The Spirits Within – July 2001 (US) Visual Effects, Square, Honolulu, Hawaii • Visual effects, Rigid/Soft body dynamics and Deformations

Armageddon- December 1998 (US) Visual effects, Dream Quest Images, The Walt Disney Company, California • Sparks, fire and debris for the exploding shuttle
• Effect animation for the debris and rocks• Gases and Asteroids

Deep Rising – January 1998 (US) Visual effects, Dream Quest Images, The Walt Disney Company, California • Digital rain and tracking of digital cameras

George of the Jungle – July 1997 (US) Visual effects, Dream Quest Images, The Walt Disney Company, California • Visual effects and elephant's interaction with the ground

Flubber- November 1997 (US) Visual effects, Dream Quest Images, The Walt Disney Company, California• Visual effects for clouds and wisps • Compositing and digital elements for the 3D environment

Sherdil- March 2019 (Pakistan) Visual Effect, NK Pictures Islamabad • VFX Advisor

Background 

Beside filmmaking and other creative genres such as poetry, calligraphy and painting, Khan also loves music and as a percussionist, he has been performing Tabla with various musicians around the world. He is a frequent presenter and speaker on VFX in motion pictures, animation and emerging technologies.

He has presented his research in conferences such as 'ACM Graphite' in Singapore, 'information visualization' in London, VIEW Conferences in Italy, ascilite conference in Australia, TED@Doha Summit, 'Computers in Education' in New Zealand and International Games Innovation Conference (IGIC) in New York City. Muqeem has also served as a member of technical committee, IASTED, The International Association of Science and Technology Development, Alberta, Canada and member of the editorial board for "Design Behaviors", the College of Design, Hanyang University and Design Research & Education Lab, Korea. He has also served as a program committee member for IGIC 2012 – International Games Innovation Conference.

He has received his Master of Arts (MA) in industrial design in 1996 with specialization in computer graphics and animation from Advanced Computing Center for Arts and Design (ACCAD) and the Department of Design at Ohio State University in Columbus, Ohio. He also obtained his Bachelor of Science degree in industrial design from the same university in 1994. His research interests include the use of emerging haptic and motion detecting techniques in the context of Intangible Cultural Heritage (ICH) and Digital Intangible Heritage. Besides teaching interactive design, graphic design, interior design and concepts for emerging technologies at Virginia Commonwealth University and Northwestern University in Qatar, Khan has been teaching predominantly 2D and 3D animation classes for over 12 years in the Persian Gulf region. As a PhD researcher, his research interests include the use of emerging motion-detecting techniques in the context of Intangible Cultural Heritage (ICH). He has been awarded research grants such as Undergraduate Research Experience Program (UREP) in 2011 and in 2013 National Priorities Research Program (NPRP) from Qatar National Research Funds (QNRF).

VFX animation and mixed reality experimentation

Artwork

References

External links 

 Meet the first Pakistani visual effects artist in Hollywood, The Express Tribune, September 2015.
 India’s Best Design Studio Jury panel, POOL, international design magazine from India, May 2015.
  Visual Wizardry: Pakistani’s Creating Visual Effects Magic, House of Pakistan, January 2015.
 ADDING LIFE TO PICTURES, Daily Tribune, Manama, Bahrain, April 2014.
 Virtual Ardha & Future of Technology, Qatar Tribune, Doha Qatar, March 2014.
 TED@Doha Muqeem Khan: "Playful technology to keep cultural heritage alive"
 Preserving the sword dance, The Peninsula, Doha, Qatar, May 2013.
 TECHNICALLY SPEAKING..., Society, Doha, Qatar, May 2013.
 Bright future for gaming industry, Gulf Times, Qatar, April 2012.
 "All there for a robust film industry: Experts", Peninsula, Doha, Qatar, Oct 2011.
 "DTFF to screen six films made by NU-Q students", Peninsula, Doha, Qatar, Oct 2011.
 Combine Design Thinking with Digital Technology, Slogan, Karachi Pakistan, January 2011.
 Muqeem to bridge cultural gap, Technology Marketing Corporation (TMC), CT, US, September 2012.
 Visualisation contest winners awarded, Qatar tribune, Qatar, May 2012.
 Platform expo brings gaming experts to Doha, Gulf Times, Qatar, May 2012.
 TAMUQ awards winners of visualisation contest, Gulf Times, Qatar, April 2012.
 UAE-based filmmaker makes it to Cannes, The Gulf Today, United Arabs Emirates, April 2012.
 Platform Doha gaming expo, TimeOut Doha, Qatar, April 2012.
 DTFF to screen six films made by NU-Q students, Peninsula, Doha, Qatar, Oct 2011.

Academic staff of the University of New South Wales
Living people
Visual effects artists
Special effects people
Animation educators
1968 births
Pakistani emigrants to the United States
Articles containing video clips
Pakistani contemporary artists
American artists of Pakistani descent
Ohio State University alumni
Artists from Karachi
American University of Sharjah
National College of Arts alumni
Northwestern University faculty
Virginia Commonwealth University faculty
Pakistani expatriates in the United Arab Emirates
Academic staff of the American University of Sharjah